Usunaka Dam is a rockfill dam located in Toyama prefecture in Japan. The dam is used for flood control and irrigation. The catchment area of the dam is 13.5 km2. The dam impounds about 30  ha of land when full and can store 6950 thousand cubic meters of water. The construction of the dam was started on 1975 and completed in 1993.

References

Dams in Toyama Prefecture
1993 establishments in Japan